Eva Birnerová and Alexandra Panova were the defending champions, but they lost in the final to Tímea Babos and Mandy Minella, 4–6, 3–6.

Seeds

Draw

References 
 Main draw

Copa Colsanitas - Doubles
2013 Doubles